Uikelotu Christopher Kemoeatu (pronounced ; born January 4, 1983) is a Tongan former professional American football guard. He played college football for the University of Utah Utes, and was drafted by the Steelers in the sixth round of the 2005 NFL Draft. He is the younger brother of former NFL nose tackle Ma'ake Kemoeatu.

Early life
Kemoeatu was born in Kahuku, Hawaii. He is the younger brother of Ma'ake Kemoeatu, who also played football for the University of Utah and later entered the NFL. When Kemoeatu was three years old, the family moved to Hawaii.

Kemoeatu grew up in Kahuku, Hawaii, in northern O'ahu. He attended Kahuku High School, where he played for the school's football team. He helped lead the school to their first state championship, and was named the 2000 Hawaii High School Defensive Player of the Year. Also selected first-team all state and all league (OIA) as a defensive lineman. As a junior was selected honorable mention all state defensive lineman. Kemoeatu played on both sides of the ball in high school before playing offensive line at Utah.

College career
Kemoeatu enrolled at the University of Utah, where he played for the Utah Utes football team. Originally recruited as a defensive lineman, he was moved to offensive guard by coach Ron McBride. In 2004, his senior year, Kemoeatu was named All-American. He majored in Sociology.

Professional career

Kemoeatu was selected by the Pittsburgh Steelers in the sixth round (204th overall) in the 2005 NFL Draft. In his rookie season, he was inactive for 15 games and did not get any playing time. The following year, he made his first two starts of his career. He played 16 games throughout the 2007 season. He began the 2008 Steelers training camp on the physically unable to perform list, but began practicing in the second week. Kemoeatu replaced seven time Pro Bowler Alan Faneca on the Steelers' offensive line.

After the Steelers won Super Bowl XLIII, they re-signed Kemoeatu to a five-year contract. 

At the end of the 2010 season, Kemoeatu and the Steelers appeared in Super Bowl XLV. He was a starter in the 31–25 loss to the Green Bay Packers.

He was released on March 3, 2012.

Personal
Kemoeatu is the son of Manako Melino and Ahea Kolovetekina Kemoeatu, and has six siblings. His elder brothers Ma'ake and Tevita also attended Utah, playing defensive line. His younger brother, Benji, signed to play guard for the West Virginia University Mountaineers but didn't actually attend.

On August 27, 2014, Chris received a kidney transplant from his brother, Ma'ake.

Honours
National honours
  Order of Queen Sālote Tupou III, Member (31 July 2008).

References

External links
Steelers' player page

1983 births
Living people
Players of American football from Hawaii
American people of Tongan descent
American football offensive guards
Utah Utes football players
Pittsburgh Steelers players
Kidney transplant recipients
People from Oahu
Members of the Order of Queen Sālote Tupou III